These are the official results of the Men's 4 × 400 metre relay event at the 1980 Summer Olympics in Moscow, USSR. There were a total number of 24 nations competing. The top two in each heat and next two fastest advanced to the final.

Final
Held on Friday 1 August 1980

Heats
Held on Thursday 31 July 1980

See also
 1976 Men's Olympic Games 4 × 400 m Relay (Montreal)
 1978 Men's European Championships 4 × 400 m Relay (Prague)
 1982 Men's European Championships 4 × 400 m Relay (Athens)
 1983 Men's World Championships 4 × 400 m Relay (Helsinki)
 1984 Men's Olympic Games 4 × 400 m Relay (Los Angeles)

References

External links
 Results

R
Relay foot races at the Olympics
Men's events at the 1980 Summer Olympics